Marco Ángel Pérez (born 27 September 1977) is a Mexican former professional boxer who competed from 1996 to 2012. He held the  WBC FECARBOX super featherweight title.

Professional career

WBC FECARBOX title
In July 1999, Pérez upset the veteran Ernesto Benitez by T.K.O. to win the WBC FECARBOX Super Featherweight Championship.

On May 17, 2002 Marco Angel lost to Mexican Humberto Soto, the bout was at the Orleans Hotel and Casino in Las Vegas, Nevada.

References

External links

Boxers from Sinaloa
Sportspeople from Culiacán
Light-middleweight boxers
Light-welterweight boxers
Welterweight boxers
Super-featherweight boxers
1977 births
Living people
Mexican male boxers